In Greek mythology, Erginus  was the name of the following figures:
Erginus, king of Minyans and son of Clymenus.
Erginus, one of the  Argonauts.
 Erginus, a defender of Thebes in the war of the Seven against Thebes, killed by Hippomedon.
 Erginus, a descendant of Diomedes, who was instructed by Temenus to steal the Palladium from Argos and did so together with Leagrus (Leager), a friend of Temenus.

Notes

References 

 Apollodorus, The Library with an English Translation by Sir James George Frazer, F.B.A., F.R.S. in 2 Volumes, Cambridge, MA, Harvard University Press; London, William Heinemann Ltd. 1921. ISBN 0-674-99135-4. Online version at the Perseus Digital Library. Greek text available from the same website.
 Gaius Valerius Flaccus, Argonautica translated by Mozley, J H. Loeb Classical Library Volume 286. Cambridge, MA, Harvard University Press; London, William Heinemann Ltd. 1928. Online version at theio.com.
 Gaius Valerius Flaccus, Argonauticon. Otto Kramer. Leipzig. Teubner. 1913. Latin text available at the Perseus Digital Library.
 Lucius Mestrius Plutarchus, Moralia with an English Translation by Frank Cole Babbitt. Cambridge, MA. Harvard University Press. London. William Heinemann Ltd. 1936. Online version at the Perseus Digital Library. Greek text available from the same website.
 Publius Papinius Statius, The Thebaid translated by John Henry Mozley. Loeb Classical Library Volumes. Cambridge, MA, Harvard University Press; London, William Heinemann Ltd. 1928. Online version at the Topos Text Project.
 Publius Papinius Statius, The Thebaid. Vol I-II. John Henry Mozley. London: William Heinemann; New York: G.P. Putnam's Sons. 1928. Latin text available at the Perseus Digital Library.

Argonauts
Characters in Seven against Thebes
Characters in the Argonautica
Kings in Greek mythology